N. typica may refer to:
 Naenia typica, the gothic, a moth species found in Eurasia
 Nebaliopsis typica, a leptostracan crustacean species
 Nesillas typica, the Madagascar brush-warbler, a bird species found in Comoros and Madagascar

See also
 Typica (disambiguation)